Anthony or Antony is a masculine given name, derived from the Antonii, a gens (Roman family name) to which Mark Antony (Marcus Antonius) belonged. According to Plutarch, the Antonii gens were Heracleidae, being descendants of Anton, a son of Heracles.  Anthony is an English name that is in use in many countries. It has been among the top 100 most popular male baby names in the United States since the late 19th century and has been among the top 100 male baby names between 1998 and 2018 in many countries including Canada, Australia, England, Ireland and Scotland.

Equivalents include Antonio in Italian, Spanish, Portuguese and Maltese; Αντώνιος in Greek; António or Antônio in Portuguese; Antoni in Catalan, Polish, and Slovene; Anton in Dutch, Galician, German, Icelandic, Romanian, Russian, and Scandinavian languages; Antoine in French; Antal in Hungarian; and Antun or Ante in Croatian. The usual abbreviated form is Tony (sometimes "Tone", "Ant", "Anth" or "Anton"). Its use as a Christian name was due to the veneration of St. Anthony the Great, the founder of Christian monasticism, particularly in Egypt. Also significant was the later cult of St. Anthony of Padua.

In the United States, it is the 43rd most popular male name as of 2021, according to the Social Security Administration. When the background is Italian, Nino or Toni, shortened from Antonino, are used. Its popularity in the United Kingdom peaked during the 1940s; in 1944 it was the sixth most popular male name and was still as high as 14th in 1964.

Spelling and pronunciation
The name was historically spelled Antony, as used in William Shakespeare's play Antony and Cleopatra.  In the 17th century, the letter "h" was inserted into the spelling on the belief that the name derived from the Greek word ἄνθος (anthos), meaning "flower".  In Britain, the historical pronunciation  predominates for both spellings, while in the United States the spelling pronunciation  is more common when the "Anthony" spelling is used.

Translations and variants
 Albanian: Andon (standard Albanian and Tosk Albanian dialect), Ndue (Gheg Albanian dialect), Anton
 Arabic: أنتوني، انطوان، انطون، طانيوس، طنّوس، مطانيوس
 Basque: Andoni, Antton
 Belarusian: Антось (Antos), Энтані (Entani)
 Bengali: এন্থনি (Ēnthoni), আন্তোনিও (Āntōni'ō)
 Bulgarian: Anton, Antoan, Andon, Doncho
 Catalan: Antoni, Toni
 Chinese: 安东尼 (simplified), 安東尼 (traditional) (Mandarin: Āndōngní, Cantonese: Ōndūngnèih)
 Croatian: Anton, Antonijo, Antonio, Antun, Ante, Anto, Tonči, Tonći, Toni
 Czech: Anton, Antonín, Tonik, Tonda
 Dalmatian: Tuone
 Danish: Anton, Anthon
 Dutch: Anton, Antoon, Antonie, Antonius, Teun, Teunis, Theun, Theunis, Ton, Toon
 Esperanto: Antono, Anĉjo
 Estonian: Anton, Tõnis, Tõnu, Tõnn
 Filipino: Antonio, Antón, Onyo, Onying, Ton, Tonton, Tonio, Tonyo, Tunyíng
 Finnish: Anton, Anttoni, Antton, Antto, Toni
 French: Antoine, Antonin
 Galician: Antón
 German: Anton, Toni, Antonius, Tünn
 Greek: Αντώνιος (Antó̱nios), Αντώνης (Antonis), Andonios, Andonis  
 Gujarati: એન્થની (Ēnthanī)
 Hawaiian: Anakoni, Akoni
 Hebrew: אנטוני המלך, טוני
 Hindi: एंथनी (Ēnthanī)
 Hungarian: Antal, Tóni
 Irish: Antaine, Antoine, Antóin
 Italian: Antonio, Antonino, Antonello, Nino, Tonino, Tonio, Totò
 Japanese: アンソニー (Ansonī)
 Kannada: ಆಂಟನಿ (Āṇṭani)
 Korean: 앤토니 (Anthony)
 Latin: Antonius, Antoninus
 Latvian: Antonijs, Antons
 Lithuanian: Antanas
 Luxembourgish: Tun
 Macedonian: Anton, Antonij, Andon, Doncho
 Marathi: अंन्थोनी (Annthōnī)
 Malayalam: ആൻ്റണി (Antoni), അന്തോണി (Anthōṇī)
 Mongolian: Антони (Antoni)
 Nepali: एन्थोनी (Ēnthōnī)
 Norwegian: Anton
 Persian: آنتونی
 Polish: Anton, Antoni, Antek, Antoś, Antonin, Tolek, Tonek
 Portuguese: António (fem. Antónia), Antônio (fem. Antônia), and Antão, with diminutives Tó, Toino, Toni and Toninho.
 Romanian: Anton
 Russian: Антон (Anton)
 Sami: Ante
 Serbian: Антоније (Antonije), Анто (Anto)
 Sheng: Anto, Toni
 Slovak: Anton, Tóno, Tónko (diminutive)
 Slovene: Anton, Tone
 Spanish: Antonio, Antón, Toño (diminutive)
 Swahili: Antoni, Antonio, Toni
 Swedish: Anton, Ante
 Sylheti: আন্তনি (Antoni)
 Tamil: அந்தோணி (Antōṇi)
 Telugu: ఆంథోనీ (Ānthōnī)
 Thai: แอนโทนี่ (Xæ n tho nī̀)
 Turkish: Antuvan
 Ukrainian: Антон (Anton), Антін (Antin), Антоній (Antonij)
 Urdu: انتھونی

See also

 Andoni (given name)
 Anthon (given name)
 Anthoney
 Anthoni, name
 Anton (given name)
 Antoni
 Antonis
 Antonio
 Antonius
 Antony
 Antonia (name)
 Antoine
 Anfernee
Thony (name)
 Tony (given name)

References

External links
BehindTheName.com entry (also contains a list of versions of Anthony in other languages)

Masculine given names
English masculine given names